Nathalie Sorce (born 1979) is a Belgian singer from Mornimont. She was secretly registered in a Walloon TV talent competition Pour la gloire by a relative and went on to win. In 2000, she won the Belgian Eurovision national selection and represented her country in the Eurovision Song Contest 2000 with the song "Envie de vivre", receiving only 2 points, placing last.

References

Belgian women singers
Eurovision Song Contest entrants for Belgium
Eurovision Song Contest entrants of 2000
French-language singers of Belgium
Living people
Year of birth missing (living people)
Walloon musicians